Jonas Bauža (14 February 1942 – 5 October 2001) was a Soviet/Lithuanian footballer who played as a goalkeeper with Spartakas Vilnius, CSKA Moscow (where he won the Soviet Cup), Dynamo Moscow and Spartak Moscow.

References

External links
 

1942 births
2001 deaths
People from Tauragė
Lithuanian footballers
Soviet footballers
FK Žalgiris players
PFC CSKA Moscow players
FC Dynamo Moscow players
FC Spartak Moscow players
FC Chornomorets Odesa players
Soviet Top League players
Association football goalkeepers